is a municipality in Innlandet county, Norway. It is located in the traditional district of Hedemarken. The administrative centre of the municipality is the town of Brumunddal. Other settlements in Ringsaker include the town of Moelv and the villages of Furnes, Kvål, Kylstad, Mesnali, Nydal, Rudshøgda, Stavsjø, Tingnes, and Byflaten.

The  municipality is the 77th largest by area out of the 356 municipalities in Norway. Ringsaker is the 30th most populous municipality in Norway with a population of 35,073.

General information

The municipality of Ringsaker was established on 1 January 1838 (see formannskapsdistrikt law).

During the 1960s, there were many municipal mergers across Norway due to the work of the Schei Committee. On 1 January 1964, the municipality of Ringsaker (population: 16,490) was merged with the neighboring municipalities of Furnes (population: 7,288) and Nes (population: 4,184) plus the Hamarsberget and Vikersødegården exclave areas of the municipality of Vang (population: 34) to create the new, larger municipality of Ringsaker. On 1 January 1965, a part of Ringsaker (population: 100) was transferred to the neighboring Hamar Municipality. On 1 January 1967 there was a municipal land swap between Vang and Ringsaker municipalities. The  Stav, Valsigsvea, and Arnkvern Nedre areas of Vang (population: 50) was transferred to Ringsaker Municipality and the  Stensby and Holmlund areas of Ringsaker (population: 114) was transferred to Vang.

On 1 January 1992, the parts of the Stensby, Hanstad, Viker, and Stammerud areas of Ringsaker (population: 224) were transferred to the neighboring Hamar Municipality.

Name
The municipality (originally the parish) is named after the old Ringsaker farm, since the first Ringsaker Church was built there.

Coat of arms
The coat of arms was granted on 1 February 1985. The arms show a silver or white moose on a red background. The moose in the arms is taken from pre-historic cave paintings found at the Stein farm in Ringsaker, indicating the early inhabitation of the area. They were designed by Arne Løvstad.

Churches

The Church of Norway has six parishes within the municipality of Ringsaker. The municipality makes up all of the Ringsaker prosti (deanery) within the Diocese of Hamar.

Geography
Ringsaker is located on the east side of the lake Mjøsa, the largest lake in Norway. It borders the municipality of Lillehammer to the northwest; the municipalities of Øyer, Stor-Elvdal, and Åmot to the north; Hamar Municipality to the east; the municipalities of Stange and Østre Toten to the south; and Gjøvik Municipality to the west.

Ringsaker is situated in an agricultural and lumbering region. Ringsaker lies in the traditional district of Hedmarken which consists largely of rolling agricultural terrain, hilly green mountains, and pine forests. The Hedmarksvidda plateau is in the upper parts of the municipality. The rivers Brumunda, Flakstadelva, and Moelva all flow through the municipality.

The principal urban centers in Ringsaker include the towns of Brumunddal and Moelv.

Economy
Ringsaker's main industries are agriculture, forestry, and diversified manufacturing. The area of Sjusjøen has a relatively large amount of holiday cottages that are especially attractive for outdoor sports including cross-country skiing vacations.

Government
All municipalities in Norway, including Ringsaker, are responsible for primary education (through 10th grade), outpatient health services, senior citizen services, unemployment and other social services, zoning, economic development, and municipal roads. The municipality is governed by a municipal council of elected representatives, which in turn elects a mayor.  The municipality falls under the Østre Innlandet District Court and the Eidsivating Court of Appeal.

Municipal council
The municipal council  of Ringsaker is made up of 39 representatives that are elected to four year terms. The party breakdown of the council is as follows:

Mayors
The mayors of Ringsaker include (incomplete list):
1932-1941: Karl Østvold (Ap)
1941-1942: Oskar Kjonerud (NS)
1942-1945: Anders Rud (NS)
1945-1964: Karl Østvold (Ap)
1965-1981: Peder Esbjørnsen (Ap)
1982-1991: Magne Johansen (Ap)
1991-2007: Thor Lillehovde (Ap)
2007–present: Anita Ihle Steen (Ap)

History

Harald Hårfagre in 882
Ringsaker is first mentioned in King Harald Hårfagre's Saga, in the Heimskringla by Snorri Sturluson. The saga reports that Harald Hårfagre (872–930) was but ten years old when he succeeded his father (Halfdan the Black). After Halfdan the Black's death, many chiefs coveted the dominions he had left. Among these King Gandalf was the first; then Högne and Fróði, sons of King Eystein of Hedemark; and also King Hogne Karuson of Ringerike.

Hake, the son of Gandalf, led an expedition of 300 men against Vestfold. King Harald's army, led by Guthorm, met and fought a great battle, and King Harald was victorious, killing king Hake. Then King Harald turned back, but King Gandalf had come to Vestfold so they defeated him also. When the sons of King Eystein in Hedemark heard the news, they proposed to meet at Ringsaker in Hedemark with the remaining kings, Hogne Karuson and Herse Gudbrand. King Harald and Guthorm found out where the Oppland kings were meeting, and coming undetected at night, set fire to the houses in which Hogne Karuson and Herse Gudbrand slept. King Eystein's two sons and their men fought, but both Hogne and Frode died.

After the fall of these kings, King Harald had subdued Hedemark, Ringerike, Gudbrandsdal, Hadeland, Thoten, Romerike, and the whole northern part of Vingulmark. In addition, King Gandalf was slain, and King Harald took the whole of his kingdom as far south as the river Raum (Glomma).

Saint Olaf in 1018
Ringsaker is again mentioned in a saga about 1018 when Olaf (later Saint Olaf) sent people to advise the Opplands that he was coming, as it was custom for the king to live as guest there every third year. In the autumn, he left Sarpsborg and went first to Vingulmark. He inquired about their Christianity, teaching some and punishing others. He went through that district, and on to Romerike. Christianity was weaker there and he punished all who had not obeyed his word. The king of Romerike proceeded to Ringsaker, to consult King Hrorek of Hedemark. They sent messages to King Gudrod of Gudbrandsdal, and to the King of Hadaland, inviting them to meet at Hedemark. The kings agreed to resist Olaf. They summoned the leaders from their kingdoms, and when they had assembled, the kings directed them to gather warriors. Most approved of the measure, but the kings were betrayed to Olav by Ketil Kavl of Ringanes (the southernmost district in Hedemark, Stange), who proceeded rapidly down lake Mjøsa to Eid, where Olaf was then located.

King Olaf, accompanied by 400 men, arrived at Ringsaker before the next day dawned. Ketil knew where the kings slept, and Olaf had all these houses surrounded. The kings were taken prisoners. King Hrorek's eyes were put out. King Gudrod's tongue was cut out. King Ring and two others were banished from Norway. King Olaf took possession of the land these kings had possessed, and after this Olaf alone bore the title of king in Norway.

Sigurd of Røyr in 1163
Sigurd of Røyr, who was Haakon II's champion, lived at Røyr (Rør) in Ringsaker. He died at Re in 1163.

Institutions
A SOS Children's Village has been planned for Ringsaker—Norway's second.

Notable residents

Public service 

 Eilert Waldemar Preben Ramm (1769 in Furnes – 1837): Norwegian military officer and representative at the Norwegian Constitutional Assembly in 1814
 Jens Rynning (1778–1857): priest and public education advocate, worked in Ringsaker
 Hovel Helseth (1779 in Nes – 1865): industrial pioneer in the Norwegian textile industry
 Gustav Heiberg (1856 in Nes – 1935): barrister and politician, mayor of Hamar pre-WWI
 Adolph M. Christianson (1877 in Brumunddal – 1954): justice of the North Dakota Supreme Court
 Johannes Bøe (1891 in Ringsaker – 1971): archaeologist
 Sven Sømme (1904 in Ringsaker – 1961): zoologist and ichthyologist and WWII XU activist
 Helge Skappel (1907 in Ringsaker – 2001): aviator, photographer and cartographer
 Peter A. Munch (1908 in Nes – 1984): sociologist, academic and author; US emigrant, twice worked on Tristan da Cunha
 Imre Hercz (1929–2011): Jewish Hungarian-Norwegian physician and public debater, worked in Brumunddal
 Thor Lillehovde (born 1948 in Ringsaker): politician, mayor of Ringsaker 1991 to 2007

The arts 

 Lars Pinnerud (1700 in Furnes – 1762): farmer and woodcarver
 Peder Balke (1804–1887): painter of romantic and dramatic landscapes, brought up in Ringsaker
 Ole Rynning (1809 in Ringsaker – 1838): emigrant pioneer and author
 Gudmund Stenersen (1863 in Ringsaker – 1934): painter, illustrator and dentist
 Tryggve Andersen (1866 in Ringsaker – 1920): novelist, poet and storywriter
 Sigrid Undset (1882–1949): author, awarded the 1928 Nobel Prize for Literature, buried at Mesnali
 Nils Johan Rud (1908 in Ringsaker – 1993): novelist, writer of short stories and magazine editor
 Alf Prøysen (1914 in Ringsaker – 1970): author, poet, playwright, songwriter and musician
 Jon Balke (born 1955 in Furnes): jazz pianist, leads the Magnetic North Orchestra
 Helge Lien (born 1975 in Moelv): jazz pianist, composer, band leader and photographer
 Julia Schacht (born 1982 on Helgøya): actress 
 Gaute Ormåsen (born 1983 in Brumunddal): singer

Sport 
 Olivius Skymoen (1857 in Grefsheim – 1909): sports shooter, competed at the 1908 Summer Olympics
 Kolbjørn Kvam (1865 in Nes – 1933): sports shooter, competed at the 1908 Summer Olympics
 Ansten Samuelstuen (1929 in Brøttum – 2012): Norwegian-American ski jumper, competed in the 1960 and 1964 Winter Olympics
 Ole Ellefsæter (born 1939 in Furnes): retired cross-country skier, won two gold medals at the 1968 Winter Olympics
 Mia Svele (born 2001 in Ringsaker): handball player

Gallery

References

External links

Municipal fact sheet from Statistics Norway 
Municipal website 

 
Municipalities of Innlandet
1838 establishments in Norway